Aston Powe (born 25 July 1919, date of death unknown) was a Jamaican cricketer. He played in one first-class match for the Jamaican cricket team in 1947/48.

See also
 List of Jamaican representative cricketers

References

External links
 

1919 births
Year of death missing
Jamaican cricketers
Jamaica cricketers
Sportspeople from Kingston, Jamaica